The Chief Presidential Secretary for Policy (Korean: 대통령정책실장; Hanja: 大統領政策室長) was a ministerial level position at the Office of President appointed by the President of South Korea.

President Roh first created this post. The succeeding president Lee changed its status to the vice-ministerial level. President Moon returned this post to a ministerial-level position which was abolished under Park's administration. Moon's successor Yoon abolished the post following his promise to reduce the size of the presidential secretariat.

List of presidential secretaries for policy

See also
 Office of the President (South Korea)
 Chief of Staff to the President (South Korea)
 Senior Presidential Secretary
 President of South Korea
 Government of South Korea
 Politics of South Korea

References

Government of South Korea